I Like to Riff was the first recording by the Minneapolis jazz vocal trio  Rio Nido, released in 1978. The original LP was long out-of-print until re-released on CD in 2007 by the Japanese label, Bittersweet America.

Track listing
 "Minnie the Moocher's Wedding Day" (Harold Arlen, Ted Koehler) (From a Cab Calloway Cotton Club revue. Arrangement by Connie Boswell and The Boswell Sisters - 1932)
 "The Trouble With Me is You" (Pinky Tomlin and Harold Tobias) (From a recording of the Nat King Cole Trio - 1941)
 "In Walked Bud" (Thelonious Monk, lyrics by Jon Hendricks)
 "Hannah in Savannah" (Grace Leroy Kahn) (From a recording of Al Jolson's last USO tour)
 "Wacky Dust" (Oscar Levant and Stanley Adams) (Adapted from a recording of the Chick Webb Orchestra with Ella Fitzgerald - 1938. Additional lyrics by Sparks, Lieberman, and Tim Gadban.)
 "Gone" (Austin Powell) (Recorded by The Cats and the Fiddle - 1941) Horn arrangement by Tim Sparks
 "I Like to Riff" (Nat King Cole)
 "Shanghai Lil" (Harry Warren and Al Dubin)) (Introduced by James Cagney in the Busby Berkeley film '"Footlight Parade" - 1933)
 "Most Gentlemen Don't Like Love" (Cole Porter) (From the 1938 Broadway musical "Leave it to Me")
 "The Man With the Jive" (Stuff Smith) (From a recording by Stuff Smith and His Onyx Club Orchestra - 1938.) Horn arrangement by Tim Sparks
 "Crazy People" ("Ragtime" Jimmy Monaco and Edgar Leslie) (Arrangement by Connee Boswell and The Boswell Sisters, featured in "The Big Broadcast of 1932")

Personnel
Prudence Johnson - vocals
Tim Sparks - vocals, guitar
Tom Lieberman - vocals, guitar
Eddie Berger - alto sax, baritone sax, soprano sax, clarinet
Butch Thompson - clarinet
Jim Price - fiddle
Hearn Gadbois - conga
Willie Murphy - bass
Gary Raynor - bass
Steve Benson - bass sax
Peter Ostroushko - mandolin

Production notes
Produced by Rio Nido
Executive producer - Charlie Campbell
Technical assistant - Tim Ackerman
Engineered and mixed by Dave Ray, Chris Hinding and Michael McKern
Artwork by John Hanson
Photography by Matt Spector and Dennis Widstrand

External links 
 Tim Sparks website
 Prudence Johnson website 

Rio Nido albums
1977 debut albums